The 1989 Alberta general election was held on March 20, 1989, to elect members of the Legislative Assembly of Alberta.

Many political observers were surprised by the early election call as less than three years had passed since the previous election.  Premier Don Getty, in his second election as Progressive Conservative Party leader, led it to its sixth consecutive term in government, although supported by less than half the votes cast in the election.

Despite losing a significant share of the popular vote, the PC's benefited from a split vote between the two main opponents Liberals and NDP. Together those two parties received 55 percent of the vote to the Conservative's 44 percent.

The Conservatives sustained a net loss of only two seats in the legislature. Most notably, the premier lost his own seat of Edmonton-Whitemud to Liberal candidate Percy Wickman. The PC's were reduced to just two seats in Edmonton, however despite their losses in urban areas they remained largely dominant in Calgary while their losses were somewhat offset by gains in rural areas, notably at the expense of the moribund Representative Party. Getty himself would quickly return to the Legislature by winning a by-election in a safe rural seat.

The New Democratic Party led by Ray Martin largely held its share of the popular vote, with its gains being balanced by its losses and the party left with the same number of seats (16) as in the previous in the legislature.

The Liberal Party, under new leader Laurence Decore, was the principal beneficiary of the voters' continuing distrust of Don Getty. The Liberals' share of the popular vote increased to over 28%, more than the NDP, but whereas the NDP continued to dominate in Edmonton the Liberal vote was more evenly distributed and the party's legislative caucus increased from four to only eight members.

The Representative Party, which had elected 2 candidates in the previous election, did not run any candidates in 1989 (although it remained registered).  Leader Ray Speaker defected to the Progressive Conservatives, while Walt Buck retired. The party disbanded soon after the election.

Results
Overall voter turnout was 53.60%.

Note:

* Party did not nominate candidates in the previous election.

Results by riding

|-
|Athabasca-Lac La Biche|||
|Mike Cardinal4,23745.07%
|
|Leo Piquette3,34235.55%
|
|Tom Maccagno1,79119.05%
|
||||
|Leo Piquette
|-
|Banff-Cochrane|||
|Brian Evans4,38950.82%
|
|Steven Scott1,80220.86%
|
|Jim N. Tanner2,41127.91%
|
||||
|Greg Stevens
|-
|Barrhead|||
|Kenneth R. Kowalski5,29457.41%
|
|Harold E. Wharton1,67318.14%
|
|Dave Perrin1,66018.00%
|
|J. Harvey Yuill (SoCred)5786.27%|||
|Kenneth R. Kowalski
|-
|Bonnyville|||
|Ernie Isley3,36250.20%
|
|Lori Hall1,55323.19%
|
|Denis Lapierre1,76926.41%
|
||||
|Ernie Isley
|-
|Bow Valley|||
|Tom N. Musgrove3,40560.33%
|
|Larry D. Kern66611.80%
|
|George Timko1,56127.66%
|
||||
|Tom N. Musgrove
|-
|Calgary-Bow|||
|Bonnie Laing3,96834.76%
|
|Scott Jeffrey3,51330.77%
|
|Timothy Walter Bardsley3,89234.09%
|
||||
|Neil Webber
|-
|Calgary-Buffalo
|
|Kate Thrasher3,60131.25%
|
|Iain Dunbar8777.61%|||
|Sheldon Chumir7,01460.86%
|
||||
|Sheldon Chumir
|-
|Calgary-Currie|||
|Dennis L. Anderson5,07249.45%
|
|Bruce McGuigan1,71616.73%
|
|Mairi Matheson3,43433.48%
|
||||
|Dennis L. Anderson
|-
|Calgary-Egmont|||
|David John Carter5,27252.35%
|
|Vinay Dey1,86418.51%
|
|Clive R. Mallory2,90728.87%
|
||||
|David John Carter
|-
|Calgary-Elbow|||
|Ralph Klein4,50549.52%
|
|David Jones7197.90%
|
|Gilbert J. Clark3,68240.47%
|
|Larry R Heather (Ind.)1741.91%|||
|David J. Russell
|-
|Calgary-Fish Creek|||
|William Edward Payne6,99647.86%
|
|Tom Polmear2,07114.17%
|
|Wayne Gillis5,51737.74%
|
||||
|William Edward Payne
|-
|Calgary-Foothills|||
|Patricia Black5,34137.13%
|
|Theresa Catherine Baxter4,13328.74%
|
|Harvey Locke4,86633.83%
|
||||
|Janet Koper
|-
|Calgary-Forest Lawn
|
|Moe Amiri3,17735.01%|||
|Barry Pashak3,99444.02%
|
|Gene Czaprowski1,58417.46%
|
|Jim Othen (Ind.)2943.24%|||
|Barry Pashak
|-
|Calgary-Glenmore|||
|Dianne Mirosh5,18945.39%
|
|Barry Bristman1,19710.47%
|
|Brendan Dunphy4,58740.12%
|
|Greg Pearson (Ind.)4373.82%|||
|Dianne Mirosh
|-
|Calgary-McCall|||
|Stanley Kenneth Nelson5,10944.53%
|
|Ken Richmond3,31128.86%
|
|A. Giga3,03226.42%
|
||||
|Stanley Kenneth Nelson
|-
|Calgary-McKnight
|
|Mark Petros4,70437.91%
|
|Roy Brown2,37119.11%|||
|Yolande Gagnon5,30342.74%
|
||||
|Eric Charles Musgreave
|-
|Calgary-Millican|||
|Gordon Wells Shrake3,84042.93%
|
|Bill Flookes3,71341.51%
|
|Dale Muti1,36615.27%
|
||||
|Gordon Wells Shrake
|-
|Calgary-Montrose|||
|Rick Orman5,04454.49%
|
|Frank Gereau2,58527.92%
|
|Jamil Farhat1,60517.34%
|
||||
|Rick Orman
|-
|Calgary-Mountain View
|
|Vicky Adamson4,17133.22%|||
|Robert Andrew Hawkesworth6,46951.53%
|
|Kevin Murphy1,86214.83%
|
||||
|Robert Andrew Hawkesworth
|-
|Calgary-North Hill|||
|Frederick Alan Stewart4,91844.59%
|
|Emily Drzymala2,72024.66%
|
|Pauline Kay3,03027.47%
|
|John J. Jasienczyk (Ind.)3282.97%|||
|Frederick Alan Stewart
|-
|Calgary-North West
|
|Stan Cassin6,98541.80%
|
|Kelly Hegg2,28113.65%|||
|Frank Bruseker7,41744.38%
|
||||
|Stan Cassin
|-
|Calgary-Shaw|||
|Jim Dinning7,41252.81%
|
|Gordon M. Christie1,72812.31%
|
|Robert J. (Bob) Crump4,86534.67%
|
||||
|Jim Dinning
|-
|Calgary-West|||
|Elaine McCoy6,13346.12%
|
|Joseph Yanchula2,56419.28%
|
|Bernie Myers4,55034.22%
|
||||
|Elaine McCoy
|-
|Camrose|||
|Ken Rostad6,49463.16%
|
|Bill Scotten2,14120.82%
|
|Carol Ayers1,60515.61%
|
||||
|Ken Rostad
|-
|Cardston|||
|Jack Ady3,48374.42%
|
|Don Ferguson51711.05%
|
|Beth Wendorff66714.25%
|
||||
|Jack Ady
|-
|Chinook|||
|Shirley McClellan3,58570.98%
|
|H. James Powers76515.15%
|
|Mel H. Buffalo69113.68%
|
||||
|Henry Kroeger
|-
|Clover Bar|||
|Kurt Gesell3,71734.53%
|
|W.H. (Skip) Gordon3,50532.56%
|
|Stephen Lindop3,53332.82%
|
||||
|Walt A. Buck
|-
|Cypress-Redcliff|||
|Alan Hyland2,51448.87%
|
|Rudolf Schempp65912.81%
|
|Lloyd B. Robinson1,96838.26%
|
||||
|Alan Hyland
|-
|Drayton Valley|||
|Tom Thurber4,56345.48%
|
|Lynne Martin2,62226.13%
|
|G. (Bear) Werschler2,82628.17%
|
||||
|Shirley Cripps
|-
|Drumheller|||
|Stan Schumacher5,04959.07%
|
|Sid Holt1,65819.40%
|
|Roger Nelson1,80021.06%
|
||||
|Stan Schumacher
|-
|Dunvegan|||
|Glen Clegg4,04956.12%
|
|Jim Gurnett2,60336.08%
|
|R. Gerald Eherer5507.62%
|
||||
|Glen Clegg
|-
|Edmonton-Avonmore
|
|James Albers3,83130.17%|||
|Marie Laing5,29041.66%
|
|Don Massey3,56228.05%
|
||||
|Marie Laing
|-
|Edmonton-Belmont
|
|Walter R. Szwender3,09323.65%|||
|Thomas Sigurdson5,31940.67%
|
|Cathy Greco4,64435.51%
|
||||
|Thomas Sigurdson
|-
|Edmonton-Beverly
|
|Gary Kump3,83529.57%|||
|Ed W. Ewasiuk6,40849.41%
|
|Daryl Robb2,52019.43%
|
|Bonny Royce (Ind.)1881.45%|||
|Ed W. Ewasiuk
|-
|Edmonton-Calder
|
|Aldo De Luca2,70921.66%|||
|Christie Mjolsness5,33842.69%
|
|Lance D. White4,43535.47%
|
||||
|Christie Mjolsness
|-
|Edmonton-Centre
|
|Don Clarke3,21730.29%|||
|William Roberts4,44041.80%
|
|Mary Molloy2,82126.56%
|
||||
|William Roberts
|-
|Edmonton-Glengarry
|
|John Belzerowski3,75924.72%
|
|John Younie3,97426.14%|||
|Laurence Decore7,40148.67%
|
|Robin Boodle (Comm.)300.20%
||
|John Younie
|-
|Edmonton-Glenora|||
|Nancy Betkowski5,12847.50%
|
|George Millar2,70925.09%
|
|Hal Annett2,93527.19%
|
||||
|Nancy Betkowski
|-
|Edmonton-Gold Bar
|
|Cathy Wyatt4,38130.29%
|
|Chris Tomaschuk2,17015.00%|||
|Bettie Hewes7,83354.16%
|
|Naomi Rankin (Comm.)550.38%
||
|Bettie Hewes
|-
|Edmonton-Highlands
|
|Ziad N. Jaber2,41527.28%|||
|Pam Barrett4,99756.44%
|
|Ken Kozak1,67318.90%
|
||||
|Pam Barrett
|-
|Edmonton-Jasper Place
|
|Leslie Gordon Young4,50331.64%|||
|John McInnis4,96634.90%
|
|Karen Leibovici4,74733.36%
|
||||
|Leslie Gordon Young
|-
|Edmonton-Kingsway
|
|Allen Wasnea2,81828.92%|||
|Alex McEachern4,31444.28%
|
|Joan Cowling2,58526.53%
|
||||
|Alex McEachern
|-
|Edmonton-Meadowlark
|
|Joan Majeski4,42131.24%
|
|William A. (Bill) Mullen1,82912.92%|||
|Grant Mitchell7,87755.66%
|
||||
|Grant Mitchell
|-
|Edmonton-Mill Woods
|
|Bas Roopnarine3,47524.73%|||
|Gerry Gibeault5,82441.44%
|
|Murray W. Scambler4,72933.65%
|
||||
|Gerry Gibeault
|-
|Edmonton-Norwood
|
|Dan Papirnik1,51920.64%|||
|Ray Martin4,22957.47%
|
|Luis C. Baptista1,59421.66%
|
||||
|Ray Martin
|-
|Edmonton-Parkallen|||
|Doug Main6,16940.06%
|
|Jim Selby4,97932.33%
|
|Nadene Thomas4,20327.29%
|
||||
|Neil S. Crawford
|-
|Edmonton-Strathcona
|
|Jack Scott3,72428.86%|||
|Gordon S.B. Wright6,69651.89%
|
|Philip Lister2,43718.88%
|
||||
|Gordon S.B. Wright
|-
|Edmonton-Whitemud
|
|Donald Ross Getty8,00543.28%
|
|Nao Fernando2,09911.35%|||
|Percy Wickman8,35045.14%
|
||||
|Donald Ross Getty
|-
|Fort McMurray|||
|Norman A. Weiss4,24549.30%
|
|Ann Dort-Maclean2,74031.82%
|
|James Carbery1,60618.65%
|
||||
|Norman A. Weiss
|-
|Grande Prairie|||
|Bob Elliott5,31952.52%
|
|Evelyn Vardalas2,69626.62%
|
|Irv Macklin1,61115.91%
|
|Murray Gauvreau (SoCred)4824.76%|||
|Bob Elliott
|-
|Highwood|||
|Don Tannas5,48160.00%
|
|Janis Belgum1,59117.42%
|
|Don Dearle2,02422.16%
|
||||
|Harry E. Alger
|-
|Innisfail|||
|Gary Severtson4,16957.38%
|
|Larry Whaley1,29417.81%
|
|Bruce A. Jackson1,76124.24%
|
||||
|Nigel I. Pengelly
|-
|Lacombe|||
|Ron A. Moore4,01459.71%
|
|Cliff Reid1,21718.10%
|
|Roger Young1,46721.82%
|
||||
|Ron A. Moore
|-
|Lesser Slave Lake|||
|Pearl M. Calahasen3,24947.51%
|
|Philip G.S. Lukken1,29418.92%
|
|Denise C. Wahlstrom2,28633.43%
|
||||
|Larry R. Shaben
|-
|Lethbridge-East|||
|Archibald Dick Johnston4,99349.17%
|
|Sylvia A. Campbell2,17021.37%
|
|John I. Boras2,97329.28%
|
||||
|Archibald Dick Johnston
|-
|Lethbridge-West|||
|John Gogo4,74145.33%
|
|Joyce Green2,48323.74%
|
|Rhonda Ruston3,21030.69%
|
||||
|John Gogo
|-
|Little Bow|||
|Raymond Albert Speaker3,90779.43%
|
|Keith Ford4268.66%
|
|Elzien Schopman57911.77%
|
||||
|Raymond Albert Speaker
|-
|Lloydminster|||
|Doug Cherry3,58466.75%
|
|Gordon E. Swaters84915.81%
|
|Steve McLachlin92317.19%
|
||||
|Doug Cherry
|-
|Macleod|||
|LeRoy Fjordbotten4,45967.20%
|
|Mike Dawson1,29219.47%
|
|Darrell Piehl85612.90%
|
||||
|LeRoy Fjordbotten
|-
|Medicine Hat|||
|James Horsman6,46540.88%
|
|Wally Regehr4,08825.85%
|
|Garth Vallely5,21332.96%
|
||||
|James Horsman
|-
|Olds-Didsbury|||
|Roy Brassard4,96060.01%
|
|Tom Monto84210.19%
|
|Garfield Marks1,18214.30%
|
|Ray Young (SoCred)124915.11%|||
|Roy Brassard
|-
|Peace River|||
|Al (Boomer) Adair3,74957.62%
|
|Adele Gale Boucher1,61324.79%
|
|Erich Wahl1,12717.32%
|
||||
|Al (Boomer) Adair
|-
|Pincher Creek-Crowsnest|||
|Frederick Deryl Bradley3,26252.56%
|
|Mike Cooper2,11934.14%
|
|Stan Stoklosa81113.07%
|
||||
|Frederick Deryl Bradley
|-
|Ponoka-Rimbey|||
|Halvar C. Jonson3,72959.81%
|
|Doug Hart1,66726.74%
|
|Ervan Stobbe80812.96%
|
||||
|Halvar C. Jonson
|-
|Red Deer-North|||
|Stockwell Day3,65248.10%
|
|Gerry Clayton1,42718.80%
|
|Bernie Fritze2,26029.77%
|
|Cory Lanterman (Ind.)2313.04%|||
|Stockwell Day
|-
|Red Deer-South|||
|John Oldring4,63749.39%
|
|Linda Ross1,84019.60%
|
|Roxanne V. Prior2,87430.61%
|
||||
|John Oldring
|-
|Redwater-Andrew|||
|Steve Zarusky4,36652.83%
|
|Chris Ewasiuk2,35928.55%
|
|Dennis Holowaychuk1,52518.45%
|
||||
|Steve Zarusky
|-
|Rocky Mountain House|||
|Ty Lund4,39259.59%
|
|Dolly (Martin) Brown1,72723.43%
|
|Bob Paston1,22416.61%
|
||||
|John Murray Campbell
|-
|Sherwood Park|||
|Peter Elzinga6,46246.60%
|
|Ted Paszek3,08822.27%
|
|John Convey4,29931.00%
|
||||
|Peter Elzinga
|-
|Smoky River|||
|Walter Paszkowski3,57550.82%
|
|Bill Termeer1,72124.47%
|
|Duane Dutka1,39819.87%
|
|Roy Housworth (SoCred)3324.72%|||
|Marvin Moore
|-
|St. Albert|||
|Dick Fowler6,59045.20%
|
|Cheryl Wharton3,55224.36%
|
|Len Bracko4,27829.34%
|
|Archie Baldwin (Ind.)1471.01%|||
|Bryan Strong
|-
|St. Paul|||
|John Drobot2,93145.95%
|
|Victor Chrapko1,12417.62%
|
|Paul Langevin2,30436.12%
|
||||
|John Drobot
|-
|Stettler|||
|Brian C. Downey3,87557.75%
|
|Fred J. Rappel1,08916.23%
|
|Frank Pickering1,73125.80%
|
||||
|Brian C. Downey
|-
|Stony Plain
|
|Jim Heron4,60436.54%|||
|Stan Woloshyn4,69937.29%
|
|Dan Fitze2,73221.68%
|
|John Torringa (SoCred)5574.42%|||
|Jim Heron
|-
|Taber-Warner|||
|Robert Bogle4,93273.44%
|
|Charlene Vickers78211.64%
|
|Patrick (Pat) Flanagan98114.61%
|
||||
|Robert Bogle
|-
|Three Hills|||
|Connie Osterman4,98656.45%
|
|Fred Mertz1,85120.96%
|
|Peter Burch1,24514.10%
|
|Poul Wesch (SoCred)7418.39%|||
|Connie Osterman
|-
|Vegreville
|
|Gordon Miller3,80641.61%|||
|Derek Fox4,86553.19%
|
|Frederick G. Paasche4484.90%
|
||||
|Derek Fox
|-
|Vermilion-Viking|||
|Steve West4,08663.44%
|
|Grant Bergman1,07816.74%
|
|Greg Michaud1,25219.44%
|
||||
|Steve West
|-
|Wainwright|||
|Robert A. (Butch) Fischer4,00967.54%
|
|Willy Kelch1,18219.91%
|
|Joseph A. Vermette72612.23%
|
||||
|Robert A. (Butch) Fischer
|-
|West Yellowhead
|
|Ian Reid3,10936.72%|||
|Jerry J. Doyle3,98947.12%
|
|Sharron Johnstone1,10313.03%
|
|Harvey Ball (Ind.)2402.83%|||
|Ian Reid
|-
|Westlock-Sturgeon
|
|Leo Seguin4,95841.08%
|
|Tom Turner1,69614.05%|||
|Nicholas Taylor5,40144.75%
|
||||
|Nicholas Taylor
|-
|Wetaskiwin-Leduc|||
|Donald H. Sparrow5,76146.59%
|
|Bruce Hinkley3,13325.34%
|
|George Carrier3,44627.87%
|
||||
|Donald H. Sparrow
|-
|Whitecourt|||
|Peter Trynchy3,87749.72%
|
|Gwen E. Symington1,45618.67%
|
|Jurgen Preugschas2,43231.19%
|
||||
|Peter Trynchy
|-
|}

See also
List of Alberta political parties

References

Further reading
 

1989 elections in Canada
1989
1989 in Alberta
March 1989 events in Canada